Charles Sahag "Chip" Pashayan Jr. (born March 27, 1941) is an American lawyer and politician from California. He served as a Republican Congressman from the Fresno area in California's Central Valley from 1979 to 1991.

Biography
Born in Fresno, Pashayan attended Bullard High School, graduated with a B.A. from Pomona College in 1963 and earned his J.D. from the University of California, Hastings College of the Law in 1968. He was admitted to the California bar in 1969 and to practice before the Supreme Court of the United States in 1977. He served in the United States Army at the rank of captain from 1968 to 1970. He was special assistant to the general counsel of the U.S. Department of Health, Education, and Welfare. He earned a B.Litt. from Oxford University in 1977.

Pashayan won his first term in 1978, when he upset two-term incumbent Democrat John Hans Krebs by a 54% to 46% margin.  He represented his largely rural, conservative district until 1990, when he was defeated for reelection by Democrat Cal Dooley. He is of Armenian descent.

References

External links

1941 births
Living people
Alumni of the University of Oxford
American people of Armenian descent
California lawyers
People from Fresno, California
Pomona College alumni
United States Army soldiers
University of California, Hastings College of the Law alumni
Republican Party members of the United States House of Representatives from California
Ethnic Armenian politicians